Patricia Geary is an American author.  After writing two borderline fantasy novels, Living in Ether (1982) and Strange Toys (1987), the latter of which won the Philip K. Dick Award, she found it difficult to sell her third novel as she had a reputation primarily as a fantasy author , and returned to teaching (she teaches creative writing at the University of Redlands).  Her third novel, The Other Canyon, was published in 2002 by Gorsky Press, and another, Guru Cigarettes, in 2005.

External links

20th-century American novelists
21st-century American novelists
American fantasy writers
American women novelists
Year of birth missing (living people)
Living people
Women science fiction and fantasy writers
20th-century American women writers
21st-century American women writers